SuperCobra can refer to:
 Bell AH-1 SuperCobra, American helicopter gunship
 Evektor VUT100 SuperCobra, Czech light aircraft